David Wilson (born 28 October 1966) is an Australian swimmer. He competed in two events at the 1988 Summer Olympics.

References

External links
 

1966 births
Living people
Australian male butterfly swimmers
Olympic swimmers of Australia
Swimmers at the 1988 Summer Olympics
Sportspeople from Geelong